There is a long history of tourism in the Czech Republic. Prague belongs to the most visited cities of the world with 6–8 million visitors per year.

Tourist regions
For the needs of tourism, the Czech Republic is divided into 17 tourist regions, further divided into 40 subregions. The regions partly overlap with the administrative regions, but natural areas of tourist importance are set aside. The subregions further distinguish natural and cultural areas.

 Prague
 Prague
 Středočeský kraj
 Střední Čechy – west
 Střední Čechy – south
 Střední Čechy – northeast – Polabí
 Jižní Čechy
 Jižní Čechy
 Šumava
 Šumava
 Plzeňsko and Český les
 Český les
 Plzeňsko
 Západočeské lázně
 Západočeské lázně
 Severozápadní Čechy
 České Středohoří and Žatecko
 Krušné hory and Podkrušnohoří
 České Švýcarsko
 Českolipsko and Jizerské hory
 Českolipsko
 Jizerské hory
 Český ráj
 Český ráj
 Krkonoše and Podkrkonoší
 Krkonoše and Podkrkonoší
 Královéhradecko
 Kladské pomezí
 Hradecko
 Orlické hory and Podorlicko
 Východní Čechy
 Pardubicko
 Chrudimsko-Hlinecko
 Králický Sněžník
 Českomoravské pomezí
 Orlické hory and Podorlicko
 Vysočina
 Vysočina
 Jižní Morava
 Znojemsko and Podyjí
 Pálava and Lednicko-Valtický areál
 Slovácko
 Brno and surroundings
 Moravský kras and surroundings
 Východní Morava
 Kroměřížsko
 Zlínsko and Luhačovicko
 Valašsko
 Slovácko
 Severní Morava and Slezsko
 Beskydy – Valašsko
 Těšínské Slezsko
 Ostravsko
 Poodří – Moravské Kravařsko
 Opavské Slezsko
 Jeseníky – east
 Střední Morava and Jeseníky
 Střední Morava
 Jeseníky – west

Visitors
In 2019, before the COVID-19 pandemic, residents made up 50.5% of guests who spent at least one night in accommodation facilities (a total of 11,107,866 visitors). In 2022, the share of domestic guests was 62.2% (in absolute numbers 12,109,732 visitors, which was the most in history). In 2022, the share of tourists from Asian countries decreased significantly due to long-term anti-pandemic measures in these countries, canceled direct flights and the political situation in the world. Most non-residents arriving to the Czech Republic and staying overnight are from the following countries:

Prague is by far the most visited Czech city. In 2018, it was the 28th most visited city in the world, with 6.67 million visitors.

Tourist attractions
As of 2022, the most visited tourist destinations in the country with at least 200,000 visitors are:

The Czech Republic has 17 UNESCO World Heritage Sites, including two transnational. One of them is natural, the rest is cultural.

References

External links

CzechTourism – National tourist portal
UNESCO World Heritage List – Czech Republic
Popular tourist destinations and attractions in the Czech Republic

 
Czech Republic